Spectamen sulculiferum is a species of sea snail, a marine gastropod mollusk in the family Solariellidae.

Description
The size of the shell can reach .

Distribution
This marine species occurs off Transkei, Rep. South Africa

References

External links
 To World Register of Marine Species

sulculiferum
Gastropods described in 1987